Phaulacridium is a genus of grasshoppers in the tribe Catantopini from Australia and New Zealand. These short-horned grasshoppers have a single generation each year

Species
There are five known species of Phaulacridium:

 Phaulacridium crassum
 Phaulacridium howeanum
 Phaulacridium marginale - type species (as Caloptenus marginalis Walker)
 Phaulacridium otagoense
 Phaulacridium vittatum

Two species Phaulacridium crassum and Phaulacridium vittatum are endemic to the Australian mainland and Phaulacridium howeanum occurs only on Lord Howe Island. Phaulacridium grasshoppers require open space for thermoregulation through basking and forage in natural and modified grasslands. Females are larger than males in all five species, and size variation within Phaulacridium vittatum is associated with rainfall. It is fairly common alongside roads and in disturbed habitats in North and South Island. The Australian wingless grasshopper Phaulacridium vittatum  is regarded as an agricultural pest in some regions with the potential to shift in response to changing climate and land use.

References

External links

Acrididae genera